Iglesia de Santa María (San Antolín de Ibias) is a church in Asturias, Spain. Established in the 11th century, the nave is separated from the chancel by a large arch. The apse is divided into two areas separated by lines of imposts.

References

Churches in Asturias
11th-century establishments in the Kingdom of León
Christian organizations established in the 11th century